The Transformation of Dr. Bessel (German: Dr. Bessels Verwandlung ) is a 1927 German silent film directed by Richard Oswald and starring Jakob Tiedtke, Sophie Pagay and Hans Stüwe. It premiered at the Ufa-Palast am Zoo. It has thematic similarities with Ernst Lubitsch's 1932 film The Man I Killed. Whereas that film featured a French soldier partially assuming the identity of a dead German, in Oswald's film a German is able to survive by pretending to be French.

The film's sets were designed by the art director Franz Seemann and Bruno Lutz.

Synopsis
During the First World War, a German soldier escapes capture on the battlefield by taking the uniform of a French soldier. He then marries and settles down in Marseilles, abandoning any sense of national identity. Due to his language skills he is able to become a major success in international commerce.

Cast
 Jakob Tiedtke as Fabrikant Julius Bessel 
 Sophie Pagay as Frau Bessel 
 Hans Stüwe as Alexander, ihr Sohn 
 Agnes Esterhazy as Helene Bissel, Alexanders Frau 
 Gertrud Eysoldt as Frau Pelagie Trouille 
 Agnes Petersen-Mozzuchinowa as Germaine, ihre Nichte 
 Kurt Gerron as der Grieche Georgakopoulos 
 Angelo Ferrari as der Spanier Pedro de Ferrante 
 Betty Astor as Karin Lundbye, ein Modell 
 Sig Arno as Chevallier, ein französischer Soldat 
 Rosa Valetti as Die Wirtin des Hotel garni 
 Hella Kürty as Paulette, Hotelstubenmädchen 
 Hermann Picha as Ein französischer Buchhändler 
 Max Neufeld as Ein französischer Major 
 Otto Wallburg as Ein französischer Sergeant 
 Curt Bois as Simche Regierer 
 Ilka Grüning as Frau Regierer 
 Ferdinand Bonn as Oberst Jovan Simonitsch 
 Lydia Potechina as Frau Simonitsch 
 Hertha von Walther as Eine Miß 
 Georg Burghardt as Ein französischer Offizier 
 Eva Speyer   
 Jaro Fürth   
 Hugo Döblin   
 Friedrich Kühne   
 Harry Nestor

References

Bibliography
 Hales, Barbara, Petrescu, Mihaela & Weinstein, Valerie. Continuity and Crisis in German Cinema, 1928-1936. Camden House, 2016.
 Rogowski, Christian. The Many Faces of Weimar Cinema: Rediscovering Germany's Filmic Legacy. Camden House, 2010.

External links

1927 films
Films of the Weimar Republic
German silent feature films
Films directed by Richard Oswald
Films based on German novels
German black-and-white films
Films about identity theft
Films set in Marseille
German World War I films
1920s German films